Standby may refer to:
 Standby (air travel), a list in which passengers may request to be placed on to request an earlier or more convenient flight
 Standby (theater), an actor or performer who will appear in a particular role if the regular performer is not present
 Sleep mode (in electronics), also known as standby mode—a mode in which electronic appliances are turned off but still under power and ready to activate on command
 Standby (or ACPI S3), an ACPI mode of a computer
 Modern Standby (or InstantGo), a computer power management system
 Standby power, energy consumed by an electronic device while it is turned off or in sleep mode
 Standby (TV series), a South Korean sitcom
 Standby Records, an American independent record label
 "Standby", a song by Macintosh Plus from Floral Shoppe

See also
 Please Stand By, a 2017 comedy-drama film
 Stand By (disambiguation)